The Petřín Lookout Tower (Czech: Petřínská rozhledna) is a steel-framework tower  tall on Petřín Hill in Prague, built in 1891. It resembles the Eiffel Tower and was used as an observation tower as well as a transmission tower. Today the tower is a major tourist attraction.

Description

The Petřín Hill is roughly a half-hour walk up paths and the tower is also quite an arduous climb; however, the hill is served by a frequent Petřín funicular and the tower has an elevator for elderly and disabled people. In 2014 the tower was visited by more than 557,000 visitors, with foreigners accounting for over 70% of said visitors.

The two observation platforms are accessible via 299 stairs in sections of 13 per flight running around the inside of the structure.  A pair of staircases form a double-helix structure allowing visitors travelling up and down concurrently.

There are a gift shop and a small cafeteria on the main level. On the lowest level is a small exhibition area. One exhibition displayed Merkur Observation Towers and was held from 6 March 2013 to 30 March 2014.

Comparisons to the Eiffel Tower
Petřín Lookout Tower is often described a smaller version of the Eiffel Tower, which is 378m tall. In contrast to the Eiffel Tower, Petřín Lookout Tower has an octagonal, not square, cross-section. Further, it does not stand, as does the Eiffel Tower, on four columns of lattice steel. The whole area under its legs is covered with the entrance hall.

A similarity between the Eiffel Tower and Petřín Lookout Tower is the design of the lowest cross beams in the form of round bones.

History
In 1889, members of the Club of Czech Tourists visited the world exposition in Paris and were inspired by the Eiffel Tower. They collected a sufficient amount of money and in March 1891 the building of the tower started for the World's Jubilee Exhibition. It was finished in only four months.

The tower had a lift for six people, first on a gas train, later on an electric drive. In 1953, a television transmitter was set up in the tower and the lift was removed, the tube was filled with cables and power supply.

In 1953, a television broadcasting antenna was installed on Petřín Lookout Tower, the program feed performed by a directional radio antenna. This served as Prague's television signal provider until the opening of the Žižkov Television Tower in late 1992.

The tower was closed for public during reconstruction in 1979–1992. In 1999–2002, the tower was again completely reconstructed and a new lift for disabled and elderly people was installed.

From 21 January 2013 the tower has been operated by City of Prague Museum.

See also

 List of Eiffel Tower replicas
 List of towers

References

External links

 Petřínská rozhledna
 https://web.archive.org/web/20060112084933/http://www.rozhlednyunas.cz/rozhledny/petrinska-rozhledna-v-praze/
 http://www.pis.cz/cz/praha/adresar/petrinska_rozhledna
 
 http://www.skyscraperpage.com/diagrams/?b41048
 History of Petrinska rozhledna
 Petrin Lookout 360° Virtual Panorama

Towers in Prague
Eiffel Tower reproductions
Observation towers in the Czech Republic
Towers completed in 1891
Tourist attractions in Prague
World's fair architecture in Europe
Petřín
1891 establishments in Austria-Hungary